HK4 may refer to:

 Heckler & Koch HK4, a multi-caliber handgun produced by Heckler & Koch GmbH
 Glucokinase, an enzyme also known by the gene nomenclature HK4